Bahau people is a sub-ethnic group of the Dayak people who inhabit West Kutai Regency (9.3%), East Kalimantan, Indonesia.

They are found in regional districts of :-
 Long Iram district, West Kutai Regency
 Long Bagun district, West Kutai Regency
 Long Pahangai, Mahakam Ulu Regency

Language
The Bahau language is part of the Kayan-Murik languages.
 Kayan-Murik languages (17 languages)
 Kayan language:
 Bahau language, Bahau people of the West Kutai Regency, East Kalimantan, Indonesia
 Busang Kayan language, Busang Kayan people of the West Kutai Regency, East Kalimantan, Indonesia
 Wahau Kayan language, Wahau Kayan people of the Wahau river mouth, East Kutai Regency, East Kalimantan, Indonesia
 Mahakam Kayan language, Mahakam Kayan people of the West Kutai Regency, East Kalimantan, Indonesia
 Kayan River Kayan language, Kayan River Kayan people of the Malinau Regency, East Kalimantan, Indonesia
 Baram Kayan language, Baram Kayan people of Sarawak, Malaysia
 Rejang Kayan language, Rejang Kayan people of Sarawak, Malaysia
 Mendalam Kayan language, Mendalam Kayan people of the Kapuas Hulu Regency, West Kalimantan, Indonesia
 Modang language:
 Modang language, Modang people of the West Kutai Regency, East Kalimantan, Indonesia
 Segai language, Berau Regency, East Kalimantan, Indonesia
 Punan Muller-Schwaner:
 Aoheng language, Aoheng or Penihing people of the West Kutai Regency, East Kalimantan, Indonesia
 Punan Aput language, East Kalimantan, Indonesia
 Punan Merah language, East Kalimantan, Indonesia
 Uheng-Kereho language, Uheng-Kereho people of the Kapuas Hulu Regency, West Kalimantan, Indonesia
 Bukat language, Bukat people of the West Kutai Regency, East Kalimantan, Indonesia
 Hovongan language, Hovongan people of the Kapuas Hulu Regency, West Kalimantan, Indonesia
 Murik language:
 Murik Kayan language, Murik people of Sarawak, Malaysia

Culture

Folk Song
 Panau-Panau

Dance
 Hudoq dance

References

External links
 Kisah Perjumpaan Carl Bock dengan Suku Dayak Pemakan Manusia
 Penanggalan Peladang Dayak Bahau-Busang

Ethnic groups in Indonesia
Dayak people